Settimo Innocenti (10 November 1904 – 29 November 1987) was an Italian racing cyclist. He rode in the 1929 Tour de France.

References

External links
 

1904 births
1987 deaths
Italian male cyclists
Place of birth missing
People from Pistoia
Sportspeople from the Province of Pistoia
Cyclists from Tuscany